Rajeev Verma (born 28 June 1949) is an Indian actor. He has worked in film and television.

Early life
Rajeev Verma is a veteran Indian actor who works mainly in film and television.

Verma was born in Narmadapuram, Madhya Pradesh, India. He obtained his Architectural Degree from Maulana Azad National Institute of Technology. Later, he took a master's degree in Urban Design in Delhi's School of Planning and Architecture He is married to Rita Bhaduri, sister of Jaya Bachchan and this way he is related to the Bachchan Family. Rita is an educationist based in their hometown Bhopal and is also a theater actress who runs a group called Bhopal Theaters.

Selected filmography

References

External links
 
These 17 Talented Actors Were Regulars During The ‘90s. Here’s What They Are Doing Now
Playing father

Indian male film actors
Living people
Male actors in Hindi cinema
Indian male television actors
Male actors from Madhya Pradesh
People from Hoshangabad
Male actors in Hindi television
1949 births